A metal salen complex is a coordination compound between a metal cation and a ligand derived from N,N′-bis(salicylidene)ethylenediamine, commonly called salen. The classical example is salcomine, the complex with divalent cobalt , usually denoted as Co(salen). These complexes are widely investigated as catalysts and enzyme mimics.

The metal-free salen compound (H2salen or salenH2) has two phenolic hydroxyl groups. The salen ligand is usually its conjugate base (salen2−), resulting from the loss of protons from those hydroxyl groups. The metal atom usually makes four coordination bonds to the oxygen and nitrogen atoms.

Preparation of complexes
The salen anion forms complexes with most transition metals. These complexes are usually prepared by the reaction of H2salen ("proligand") with metal precursors containing built-in bases, such as alkoxides, metal amides, or metal acetate. The proligand may also be treated with a metal halide, with or without an added base. Lastly, the proligand may be deprotonated by a nonnucleophilic base, such as sodium hydride, before treatment with the metal halide. For example, Jacobsen's catalyst is prepared from the salen ligand precursor with manganese acetate.

Structures
Salen complexes with d8 metal ions, such as Ni(salen), typically have a low-spin square planar molecular geometry in the coordination sphere.

Other metal–salen complexes may have additional ligands above the salen nitrogen–oxygen plane. Complexes with one extra ligand, such as VO(salen), may have a square pyramidal molecular geometry. Complexes with two extra ligands, such as Co(salen)Cl(py), may have octahedral geometry. Usually the MN2O2 core is relatively planar, even though the ethylene backbone is skewed and the overall salen ligand takes a twisted C2 symmetry. Examples exist where ancillary ligands force the N2O2 donors out of planarity. No evidence indicates that salen is a redox-noninnocent ligand.

Reactions

Enzyme mimics
Tsumaki described the first metal–salen complexes in 1938. He found that the cobalt(II) complex Co(salen) reversibly binds O2, which led to intensive research on cobalt complexes of salen and related ligands for their capacity for oxygen storage and transport, looking for potential synthetic oxygen carriers. Cobalt salen complexes also replicate certain aspects of vitamin B12.

Homogeneous catalysis
The manganese-containing salen complex catalyzes  the asymmetric epoxidation of alkenes. In the hydrolytic kinetic resolution technique, a racemic mixture of epoxides may be separated by selectively hydrolyzing one enantiomer, catalyzed by the analogous cobalt(III) complex. In subsequent work, chromium(III) and cobalt(III) salen complexes catalyze the reaction of carbon dioxide and epoxides to give polycarbonates.

Related complexes

Substituted salen complexes

Unsubstituted salen complexes are poorly soluble in organic solvents. Side chains attached to the ethylene bridge or the benzene rings may increase the solubility. An example is the salpn ligand, derived from 1,2-diaminopropane instead of ethylenediamine, which is used as a metal deactivating additive in motor oils and motor fuel.

The presence of bulky groups near the coordination site is generally desirable, as it enhances catalytic activity and prevents dimerization. Salen ligands derived from 3,5-di-tert-butylsalicylaldehyde are popular because they fulfill both criteria, and tend to be soluble even in non-polar solvents like pentane.

Chirality may be introduced into the ligand either via the diamine backbone, via the phenyl ring, or both. For example, condensation of the C2-symmetric trans-1,2-diaminocyclohexane with 3,5-di-tert-butylsalicylaldehdye gives a ligand that forms complexes with Cr, Mn, Co, Al, which have proven useful for asymmetric transformations.  For an example, see the Jacobsen epoxidation, which is catalyzed by a chiral manganese-salen complex:

Complexes with salen-type ligands
"Salen-type" metal complexes are formed with ligands with similar chelating groups, such as acacen, salph, and salqu. Salqu copper complexes have been investigated as oxidation catalysts.

Complexes with salan ligands
Complexes with the similar salan or salalen ligands, with one or two saturated nitrogen–aryl bonds (amines rather than imines) tend to be less rigid and more electron-rich at the metal center than the corresponding salen complexes.

Further reading

References

 
Coordination chemistry
Organometallic chemistry
Ligands